Madden NFL 2001 is an American football video game. It is the third in the Madden NFL series to include an NFL player, Tennessee Titans running back Eddie George, on its cover (the first being Madden NFL '95, which featured Erik Williams and Karl Wilson along with Madden himself). In addition, it is the first game in the series to have a player, instead of John Madden featured prominently on the box art. Madden's picture is shown on a small logo, which would reappear for every following game until Madden NFL 06. It is also the first game in the Madden NFL series to appear on the PlayStation 2 game console. This is the first Madden game to feature NFL Europe teams.

Features
Madden NFL 2001 includes several customizable modes. Players have the ability to create a play, create a player, run a franchise, and collect Madden Cards, allowing players to perform certain actions during gameplay (for example, adding 5th downs, or limiting the CPU-controlled team to 3rd downs). The cards can also alter individual player ratings, unlock special stadiums, and unlock Hall of Fame and All-Madden teams.

Only the PC and PlayStation versions allow the player to create a team via the rosters menu, and the PlayStation 2 version have Madden Cards (297 total).

The best teams in the game overall were the Jacksonville Jaguars and the St. Louis Rams with a score of 95. The worst team in the game overall was the San Diego Chargers with the score of 70. The best offense in the game belongs to the St. Louis Rams with the score of 95. A 3-way tie for the best defense in the game belongs to the Tampa Bay Buccaneers, the Baltimore Ravens and the Jacksonville Jaguars with scores of 95. The best special teams in the game belong to the Denver Broncos with the score of 95.

The game also contains 35 Great Games that unlocks the additional teams and stadiums on PC, N64, and PS.

Teams and stadiums
Madden NFL 2001 comes with over 60 teams and over 40 stadiums. Several of the teams and stadiums are fictional like the Mummies and the Marshalls. Each fictional team has its unique type of player (e.g. mummies players are mummies and the marshall's players are cowboys). Fictional Stadiums are like Hot Stove Stadium for example.

Reception

The PlayStation and PlayStation 2 versions received "universal acclaim", while the Nintendo 64 and PC versions received "generally favorable reviews", according to the review aggregation website Metacritic. Rob Smolka of NextGen said of the PlayStation 2 version, "If you were looking for a reason to buy a PlayStation 2, this is it – superb gameplay, even better graphics, and enough substance to make you forget about all those other, weak launch titles." In Japan, where the same console version was ported and published by Electronic Arts Square under the name  on January 18, 2001, Famitsu gave it a score of 35 out of 40.

Official UK PlayStation Magazine gave the PlayStation version a score of nine out of ten and the Starplayer Award and said that it "expertly mixes arcade action with sim-deep stats and playbooks". Emmett Schkolven of Extended Play gave the PlayStation 2 version all five stars and said, "Madden NFL 2001 for the PS2 is the best-looking, smartest, most immersive game I have ever played. There's no comparing this game to anything else. From now on, all other sports titles will be compared to this."

Bro Buzz of GamePro said of the Nintendo 64 version, "For hardcore N64 football freaks, Madden NFL 2001 is all you need even as new console systems make their appearances. With the topnotch gameplay in this cart, you can give the Dreamcast, PlayStation 2, Dolphin, or even the Xbox all the time they need to produce a great football game." Brian Wright said, "If you're looking for football action on your PC this year, there's only one game in town...literally. Thankfully, Madden NFL 2001 offers enough features to please most computer gridiron fans." Cheat Monkey said that the PlayStation version "delivers a realistic and deep pro football experience for this season. With all the experience the Madden team has under its belt, this veteran simulation scores a TD in overtime to take the PlayStation title for this year." Human Tornado said, "Madden NFL 2001 for the PS2 is a sports gamer's dream come true. The great Madden gameplay is backed by a console system that finally has the power to show football action as it should be. It's fun to be this spoiled!"

Bryan Melville of AllGame gave the PlayStation version four-and-a-half stars out of five, calling it "the ultimate 32-bit football game. If you have the cash and the patience to wait, the PS2 version is undoubtedly a superior product. Still, the average player will be happy with the feel and look of the final Playstation version." Anthony Baize gave the PC version four stars, saying, "Overall, Madden NFL 2001 is a great game that perpetuates the tradition of quality games with the Madden nameplate. If you like football, you will love this game." Scott Alan Marriott gave the PlayStation 2 version the same score of four stars, saying, "When you factor in the Fantasy Mode, Madden Challenges, and crisp gameplay with the same control scheme as found in past Madden games, you have a winner for the PlayStation 2. The overall strength of NFL 2K1 on the Dreamcast keeps Madden from being the unanimous choice for best pigskin title of 2000, but you won't find a better version of the sport in this season's lineup -- on the consoles or the PC." However, William Abner of Computer Games Strategy Plus gave the PC version three-and-a-half stars out of five, saying, "If you are a Madden fan who isn't into playing online, then the decision as to whether or not it's worth another $45 bucks becomes a bit more difficult."

The game was a runner-up for GameSpots annual "Best Graphics, Technical", "Best Nintendo 64 Game", "Best PlayStation Game", and "Best Sports Game (Traditional)" awards. The PC version was a finalist for the Sports award at Computer Gaming Worlds 2001 Premier Awards, which went to Sammy Sosa High Heat Baseball 2001. The PlayStation 2 version was a finalist for the Academy of Interactive Arts & Sciences' 2000 "Console Sports Game of the Year" and "Overall Console Game of the Year" awards, both of which went to SSX. The same console version was a runner-up for Sports Game of the Year 2000 award in Editors' Choice at IGNs Best of 2000 Awards, though it did win the same category in Readers' Choice, and was also a runner-up for Graphics of 2000 as well. The PlayStation version was a runner-up for the Sports award in both Editors' and Readers' Choice as well. The PS2 version was a runner-up for the "PlayStation 2 Game of the Year" award at EGMs 2000 Gamers' Choice Awards and Readers' Choice Awards, and for "Sports Game of the Year" in the latter Choice Awards. The same console version won the awards for "Best Sports Game" and "Best Graphics, PS2" at the Official U.S. PlayStation Magazine 2000 Editors' Awards, while the PlayStation version was a runner-up for the "Game of the Year, PS1" award, which went to Tony Hawk's Pro Skater 2.

Game Informer ranked the game 27th on their top 100 video games of all time list in 2001.

Notes

References

External links
 
 
 
 

2000 video games
Madden NFL
Electronic Arts games
Nintendo 64 games
Game Boy Color games
PlayStation (console) games
PlayStation 2 games
Windows games
EA Sports games
Video games developed in the United States